Rémi Paul (June 10, 1921 – December 20, 1982) was a lawyer and politician from Quebec, Canada.

Member of the House of Commons

Born in Louiseville, Mauricie, Paul ran as a Progressive Conservative candidate in the district of Berthier-Maskinongé-Delanaudière in 1957 and lost, but was elected to the House of Commons of Canada in 1958, 1962 and 1963.  He sat as an Independent by February 18, 1965 and did not run for re-election in that same year. Paul was a friend of Quebec fascist leader Adrien Arcand who campaigned for him in the 1957 election.

Provincial politics

Paul ran as a Union Nationale in the district of Maskinongé in 1966 and won a seat at the provincial legislature. He was Speaker of the Legislative Assembly from 1966 to 1968.

He was appointed to the Cabinet and served as Minister of Justice under Premier Jean-Jacques Bertrand.

In 1970, his party lost the election to Robert Bourassa's Liberals.  Paul was re-elected and became House Leader of the Official Opposition.  However he was defeated against Liberal Yvon Picotte in 1973.

References

External links
 

1921 births
1982 deaths
Justice ministers of Quebec
Members of the House of Commons of Canada from Quebec
People from Louiseville
Progressive Conservative Party of Canada MPs
Union Nationale (Quebec) MNAs
Université Laval alumni